Podocarpus lucienii is a species of conifer in the family Podocarpaceae. It is found only in New Caledonia.

References

lucienii
Least concern plants
Taxonomy articles created by Polbot
Taxa named by David John de Laubenfels